H with descender (Ⱨ ⱨ) is a letter of the Latin alphabet, derived from H with the addition of a small descender. It was used in Uyghur to represent  (~ English h), while a regular H was used to represent  (~ German ch in ach). 

This letter was in use from the early 1960s, when a Latin alphabet, the Uyghur New Script, was introduced for writing Uighur to replace the Arabic script, until 1984–86 when the Latin alphabet was phased out and the official script was changed back to Arabic. The equivalent Arabic letter is ھ, while the Cyrillic equivalent is the shha (Һ һ).

The capital letter is homoglyphic to the Cyrillic letter en with descender (Ң ң) used in various 
Turkic languages, including Uyghur itself in its own Cyrillic alphabet. Its lowercase form resembles the shha with descender used in the Tati and Juhuri languages.

Computing codes

1 Unicode name: LATIN CAPITAL LETTER H WITH DESCENDER
2 Unicode name: LATIN SMALL LETTER H WITH DESCENDER
Ⱨ was added to Unicode in version 5.0 (2006).

See also
Ꜧ ꜧ : Latin letter Heng
Ⱪ ⱪ : Latin letter K with descender
Ⱬ ⱬ : Latin letter Z with descender
Ң ң : Cyrillic letter En with descender
Ҳ ҳ : Cyrillic letter Kha with descender
Ԧ ԧ : Cyrillic letter Shha with descender

Letters with descender (diacritic)
Latin-script letters